James Ssewakiryanga Junior, professionally known as Ssewa Ssewa, is a Ugandan live performing musician, multi – instrumentalist, founder of Janzi Band and inventor of Janzi,  a musical instrument.

Career
Son of a traditional drummer and a dancer, Ssewa Ssewa has never had any professional training. His first instrument was a xylophone, taught by his mother. He started studying business at university, but after being encouraged and taught by members of his father's band, decided to pursue music. 

Ssewa Ssewa started playing music professionally in 2000. He co-founded Janzi Band along with his friends in 2009 and has been the director since then. 

He plays nine instruments, eight of them African, and is a professional percussionist.

Ssewa Ssewa has frequently performed live. He has performed on many stages both in Uganda and abroad and has worked with many musicians including the Quela Band, Navio, A Pass, Isaiah Katumwa, Suzan Kerunen, Mame Ndiak, Giovanni Kiyingi and Hugh Masekela. He was one of the main performers at World Music Day in Uganda in June 2017 alongside Apio Moro, Haka Mukiga, Mame Ndiak, Jackie Akello and many others. He performed with Giovanni Kiyingi, a fellow multi-instrumentalist.

Janzi (Instrument)

The janzi is a string instrument invented by Ssewa Ssewa. The instrument has been used on all Janzi Band and Ssewa Ssewa’s setups since its inception. The janzi is a based on the traditional harp-like Ugandan instrument called the adungu, but the janzi is different in several ways, unique and patented as a separate instrument.

The name originates from the name of the band.

Discography
Ssewa Ssewa has worked with Janzi Band since its inception and has also worked on his solo projects.

Albums
2017 - Down in Uganda
2018 - Tuwaye
2020 - Nva K'La - Grooves from Kampala, Uganda

Songs
Nsangi (feat. Pages)
Akabengeya (feat. Abraham Sekasi)
Africa
Hybrid
At Thirty
Down in Uganda (feat. MoRoots)
Bajajja
Journey

See also
List of Ugandan musicians
Isaiah Katumwa
Giovanni Kiyingi  
Suzan Kerunen

References

External links 
DJ Vicky and Live Percussion by James Ssewa (Janzi Band) » Big Mikes

Living people
People from Kampala
21st-century Ugandan male singers
Ugandan world music musicians
1987 births
Ugandan instrumentalists
Musical instrument makers
Janzi Band members